The Louisville Ridge, also known as the Louisville Seamount Chain, is an underwater chain of over 70 seamounts located in the Southwest portion of the Pacific Ocean. The chain may have been formed by movement of the Pacific Plate over the Louisville hotspot or by leakage of magma from the shallow mantle up through the Eltanin fracture zone, which it follows closely.

Depth-sounding data first revealed the existence of the seamount chain in 1972.

Seamounts
The Louisville Ridge includes the following:

Burton Seamount
Currituck Seamount
Danseur Seamount
Darvin Guyot
Forde Seamount
Louisville Seamount
Osbourn Seamount
Pierson Seamount
Rumyantsev Seamount
Seafox Seamount
Trobriant Seamount
Valerie Guyot
Vostok Seamount

See also
 Hollister Ridge
 Hotspot (geology)

References

External links
Expedition 330 - Louisville Seamount Trail, Integrated Ocean Drilling Program, 13 December 2010 to 11 February 2011
The Louisville Ridge – Tonga Trench collision: Implications for subduction zone dynamics, RV Sonne Research Expedition SO215 Cruise Report, 25 April 2011 to 11 June 2011

Seamounts of the Pacific Ocean
Guyots
Oceanography
Hotspot tracks
Seamount chains